The following are the winners of the 36th annual (2009) Origins Award, presented at Origins 2010.

External links
 2009 Origins Award Winners and Nominees

2009 awards
 
2009 awards in the United States